The second season of the American television series Bones premiered on August 30, 2006, and concluded on May 16, 2007, on Fox. The show aired on Wednesdays at 8:00 pm ET for the entire season and consisted of 21 episodes. The season averaged 9.4 million viewers.

This season saw a reworking of the original opening credits sequence to match each actor’s name to footage of their character.

Cast and characters

Main cast 
Tamara Taylor joined the cast this season after the departure of Jonathan Adams. Taylor first appeared in the first six episodes of the season as a guest star and was promoted to a series regular and appeared in the opening credits beginning with episode 7.
 Emily Deschanel as Dr. Temperance "Bones" Brennan, a forensic anthropologist
 David Boreanaz as FBI Special Agent Seeley Booth, the official FBI liaison with the Jeffersonian
 Michaela Conlin as Angela Montenegro, a forensic artist
 Eric Millegan as Dr. Zack Addy, Dr. Brennan's lab assistant and now a professional forensic anthropologist
 T. J. Thyne as Dr. Jack Hodgins, an entomologist
 Tamara Taylor as Dr. Camille Saroyan, a forensic pathologist and the new head of the forensic division

Recurring cast 
 Eddie McClintock as Tim "Sully" Sullivan
 Patricia Belcher as Caroline Julian, a prosecutor
 Stephen Fry as Dr. Gordon Wyatt, Booth's psychiatrist who evaluates his behavior
 Nathan Dean as FBI Special Agent Charlie Burns
 Ryan O'Neal as Max Keenan, Brennan's fugitive father
 Jessica Capshaw as Rebecca Stinson, Booth's ex-girlfriend and Parker's mother
 Heath Freeman as Howard Epps, a serial killer
 Ty Panitz as Parker Booth, Booth's son
 Chris Conner as Oliver Laurier
 Loren Dean as Russ Brennan, Brennan's brother
 Billy Gibbons as Angela's father
 David Greenman as Marcus Geier, a forensic technician
 Danny Woodburn as Alex Radziwill, a Diplomatic immunity and State Department official

Episodes 
The episode "Player Under Pressure" was originally supposed to air in April 2007 as episode 19, but was delayed in the wake of the Virginia Tech massacre, as the episode's plot featured finding human remains on a college campus. The episode later aired in April 2008 as part of the third season, with new footage. The episode "Aliens in a Spaceship" introduces the storyline of the Grave Digger, an unresolved case. The Grave Digger would later return in the fourth season, when the team discovers its identity. Serial killer Howard Epps returns for two episodes, in which the team must discover more of his victims.

DVD release 
The second season of Bones was released on DVD in region 1 on September 11, 2007, in region 2 on October 15, 2007 and in region 4 on December 3, 2008. The set includes all 21 episodes of season two on a 6-disc set presented in anamorphic widescreen. Special features include two audio commentaries—"The Glowing Bones in the Old Stone House" by writer Stephen Nathan, actress Emily Deschanel and director Caleb Deschanel and "Stargazer in a Puddle" by executive producers Stephen Nathan, Barry Josephson and Hart Hanson. Featurettes include "The Memories in the Season" and "Visceral Effects: The Digital Illusions of Bones". Also included are deleted scenes and a gag reel.

References 

General references

External links 
 
 

Season 02
2006 American television seasons
2007 American television seasons